Indian Burying Place is a settlement in Newfoundland and Labrador.

Ghost towns in Newfoundland and Labrador